Kashgar Airport , also known as Kashi Airport, is a dual-use military-civilian airport serving Kashgar (also known as Kashi), a city in Uyghur autonomous region of Xinjiang in the People's Republic of China.

The airport opened on 10 March 1954. In 2006 the first international flights started.

Facilities

Airlines and destinations

Cargo

See also

List of airports in the People's Republic of China

Footnotes

External links
 
 

Airports in Xinjiang